Bulbophyllum ornatissimum is a species of orchid.

ornatissimum